This article is a list of prisoners of Nazi concentration camps designated return unwanted, which was used to forbid their release and indicate that their death was desired by the Nazi regime.

References

German military-related lists
Lists of Nazi concentration camps
Lists of prisoners and detainees
Germany in World War II-related lists